EACC means: 
 East African Coast Current, part of the Somali Current
 East Arkansas Community College, Forrest City, Arkansas, United States
 East Asian Character Code, the Chinese Character Code for Information Interchange
 Edinburgh Academical Cricket Club or Edinburgh Accies, a cricket club in Edinburgh, Scotland
 Ethics and Anti-Corruption Commission (established 2011), Kenya
 European Airlift Coordination Cell, improve the utilisation of European military air transport and aerial refueling capabilities
 European American Chamber of Commerce, an organization whose objective is to promote business between Europe and the United States
 European Assisted Conception Consortium
 Improved electric accessories (eACC), an commonly used automotive acronym